Michał Mak (born 14 November 1991) is a Polish professional footballer who plays as a winger for Wieczysta Kraków.

Career
On 31 August 2016, Mak was loaned to Arminia Bielefeld for the 2016–17 season in 2. Bundesliga.

Career statistics

Personal life
His twin brother, Mateusz Mak, plays for Stal Mielec. They played together for Ruch Radzionków and GKS Bełchatów.

Honours
Lechia Gdańsk
 Polish Cup: 2018–19

References

External links
 
 

1991 births
Living people
Polish footballers
Poland under-21 international footballers
Ruch Radzionków players
GKS Bełchatów players
Lechia Gdańsk players
Arminia Bielefeld players
Śląsk Wrocław players
Wisła Kraków players
Górnik Łęczna players
Ekstraklasa players
I liga players
2. Bundesliga players
People from Sucha Beskidzka
Sportspeople from Lesser Poland Voivodeship
Association football forwards
Polish expatriate footballers
Expatriate footballers in Germany
Polish expatriate sportspeople in Germany